Zygobothria   is a subgenus of flies in the family Tachinidae.

Species
Drino atra Liang & Chao, 1998
Drino atropivora (Robineau-Desvoidy, 1830)
Drino ciliata (Wulp, 1881)
Drino grandicornis Mesnil, 1977
Drino hirtmacula (Liang & Chao, 1990)
Drino longiseta Chao & Liang, 1998
Drino lugens (Mesnil, 1944)
Drino pollinosa Chao & Liang, 1998
Drino trifida (Wulp, 1890)

References

Insect subgenera
Taxa named by Josef Mik
Exoristinae
Diptera of Asia
Diptera of Africa
Diptera of Europe
Diptera of Australasia